Lasioglossum rufitarse  is a Holarctic species of sweat bee.

References

External links
Images representing  Lasioglossum rufitarse

Hymenoptera of Europe
rufitarse
Insects described in 1838